Mario Garavaglia (born 1937) is an Argentine physicist.

Biography
He was born in Junín (Buenos Aires Province, Argentina) in 1937.

In 1999 the International Commission for Optics awarded him the Galileo Galilei Award by unanimous vote for his work on lasers and their applications in industry, medicine and biology and for promoting optics in Latin America.

In 2004 he received the Houssay Career Award.

References

External links
 

1937 births
Living people
20th-century Argentine physicists
People from Junín, Buenos Aires